Artat (also Romanized as Ārtat and Ertat) is a village in Chashm Rural District, Shahmirzad District, Mehdishahr County, Semnan Province, Iran. At the 2006 census, its population was 67, in 15 families.

References 

Populated places in Mehdishahr County